Olivia Ruth Garfield  (born 10 September 1975) is a British businesswoman. She is the chief executive of Severn Trent, and formerly the chief executive of Openreach, a BT Group business.

Early life
Olivia was raised in Harrogate. Her parents, who were originally from Liverpool, run a project management and engineering business in Harrogate. Her grandfather was the groundsman at Goodison Park. She was educated at Birklands Belmont School (now Belmont Grosvenor) in Birstwith near Harrogate, followed by the co-educational Bootham School, an independent school in York. She had an ambition to be a presenter of Blue Peter. She read German and French (Modern and Medieval Languages) at the all-female New Hall, Cambridge, now Murray Edwards.

Career
After graduating, she spent a year working at the British Consulate in Brussels. She then worked at Accenture as a consultant in their communications and high-tech market division for six years.

BT
In January 2003, she joined BT as general manager, running a desk-based sales team. She later became BT's director of strategy and regulatory affairs. On 1 April 2011 she was made chief executive of their Openreach division; Openreach had been formed in 2006. In that position, she spearheaded and oversaw the £2.5 billion rollout of fibre broadband (BT Infinity service) to two thirds of the UK. In March 2017, BT received the biggest Ofcom fine ever of £42 million due to inappropriate use of the Deemed Consent to delay Ethernet provision to other providers, which started and continued in January 2013 through to December 2014 while she was CEO. In 2013, Garfield was identified by Fortune Magazine as one of the world's fastest-rising corporate stars. In 2014, Fortune called her the 14th Most Powerful Woman in Europe, Middle East, and Africa.

Severn Trent
In April 2014, she became the chief executive of Severn Trent. In July 2015, while she was the chief executive of Severn Trent she oversaw the takeover of Severn Trent Water Purification, a subsidiary of Severn Trent Plc, by Italian company DeNora  which resulted in redundancies. Then in November 2017, the company announced plans to sell its surplus land. As of May 2018, Garfield's role at Severn Trent made her the youngest female CEO of a FTSE 100 company.

She was appointed Commander of the Order of the British Empire (CBE) in the 2020 Birthday Honours for services to the water industry, whilst at the same time the aggregate annual spill durations to rivers and streams from Severn Trent's sewer overflows totalled 64 years.

Tesco
In February 2013, she became a non-executive director at Tesco. She stepped down in February 2015.

In May 2018, Garfield was announced as the 2018 winner of the prestigious Veuve Cliquot Business Woman Award.

Personal life
Her husband Morgan Garfield (born 22 January 1976), whom she met at university when he was at Fitzwilliam College, Cambridge, runs a property investment fund. She married in 2002 in North Yorkshire.

See also
 Andrew Duff (businessman), Chairman of Severn Trent since July 2010, and former Chairman of RWE npower from 2003–09.
 Véronique Laury, French CEO of Kingfisher plc since February 2015
 Moya Greene, Canadian CEO of the Royal Mail from July 2010
 Dame Carolyn McCall, CEO of EasyJet since 2010

References

External links
 Severn Trent

Accenture people
Alumni of New Hall, Cambridge
British Telecom people
British women business executives
English chief executives
People educated at Bootham School
People from Harrogate
Women chief executives
Living people
1975 births
Commanders of the Order of the British Empire